Ottó Boros (5 August 1929 – 18 December 1988) was a Hungarian water polo player who competed in the  1956 Summer Olympics, in the 1960 Summer Olympics, and in the 1964 Summer Olympics.

He was born in Békéscsaba and died in Szolnok.

Boros was part of the Hungarian team which won the gold medal in the 1956 tournament. He played four matches as goalkeeper.

Four years later he was a member of the Hungarian team which won the bronze medal in the 1960 Olympic tournament. He played five matches as goalkeeper.

At the 1964 Games he won his second gold medal with the Hungarian team. He played three matches as goalkeeper.

See also
 Hungary men's Olympic water polo team records and statistics
 List of Olympic champions in men's water polo
 List of Olympic medalists in water polo (men)
 List of men's Olympic water polo tournament goalkeepers
 Blood in the Water match

External links
 

1929 births
1988 deaths
Hungarian male water polo players
Water polo goalkeepers
Olympic water polo players of Hungary
Water polo players at the 1956 Summer Olympics
Water polo players at the 1960 Summer Olympics
Water polo players at the 1964 Summer Olympics
Olympic gold medalists for Hungary
Olympic bronze medalists for Hungary
Olympic medalists in water polo
Medalists at the 1964 Summer Olympics
Medalists at the 1960 Summer Olympics
Medalists at the 1956 Summer Olympics
People from Békéscsaba
Sportspeople from Békés County
20th-century Hungarian people